The Galilee campaign, also known as the Northern Revolt, took place in the year 67, when Roman general Vespasian invaded Galilee under the orders of Emperor Nero in order to crush the Great Revolt of Judea. Many Galilean towns gave up without a fight, although others had to be taken by force.  By the year 68, Jewish resistance in the north had been crushed, and Vespasian made Caesarea Maritima his headquarters and methodically proceeded to cleanse the coastline of the country, avoiding direct confrontation with the rebels at Jerusalem.

The Galilee campaign is unusually well-recorded for the era.  One of the Jewish rebel leaders in Galilee, Josephus, was captured.  Josephus struck up a friendship with Vespasian, who would later ascend to become Roman Emperor.  Josephus was eventually freed and given a place of honor in the Flavian dynasty, taking the name Flavius, and worked as a court historian with the backing of the Imperial family.  In his work The Jewish War, the chief source on the Great Revolt, he provides detailed accounts of the sieges of Gamla and Yodfat, and of internal Jewish politics during the Galilee campaign.

Timeline
After the defeat of Gallus' army at Bet Horon in the year 66, Emperor Nero appointed general Vespasian, instead of Gallus to crush the Judean rebellion. Vespasian, along with legions X Fretensis and V Macedonica, landed at Ptolemais in April 67. There he was joined by his son Titus, who arrived from Alexandria at the head of Legio XV Apollinaris, as well as by the armies of various local allies including that of king Agrippa II. Fielding more than 60,000 soldiers, Vespasian began operations by subjugating Galilee. Many Galilean towns gave up without a fight, although others had to be taken by force. Of these, Josephus provides detailed accounts of the sieges of Gamla and Yodfat.

Casualties
According to Josephus, the Roman vanquishing of Galilee resulted in 100,000 Jews killed or sold into slavery.

Aftermath
By the year 68, Jewish resistance in the north had been crushed, and Vespasian made Caesarea Maritima his headquarters and methodically proceeded to cleanse the coastline of the country, avoiding direct confrontation with the rebels at Jerusalem.

References 

67
60s in the Roman Empire
Jews and Judaism in the Roman Empire
Galilee Campaign
History of the Middle East
First Jewish–Roman War
1st-century battles
60s conflicts